Giovanni Alberghetti, also known as Giovanni Alberghetti the Elder, Zuanne or Zanin Alberghetti, (active c. 1491–1505), was an Italian Renaissance sculptor. His dates of birth and death are not known.

Alberghetti is known primarily through works in bronze attributed to him. He sculpted a bronze bowl that can be found at the Columbia Museum of Art. He also produced bronzes of God the Father and of the Virgin della Scarpa for the Cappella Zeno at San Marco.

References

15th-century Italian sculptors
Italian male sculptors
16th-century Italian sculptors
Year of birth unknown
Year of death unknown
Italian Renaissance sculptors